Mian Maleh Abbasabad (also Romanized as Mīān Maleh ʿAbbāsābād; also known as Mīānmaleh ʿAbbāsābād Oladqobad) is a village in Kuhdasht-e Shomali Rural District, in the Central District of Kuhdasht County, Lorestan Province, Iran. At the 2006 census, its population was 162, in 31 families.

References 

Towns and villages in Kuhdasht County